Ilyinki is a rural locality (a village) in Petushinskoye Rural Settlement, Petushinsky District, Vladimir Oblast, Russia. The population was 12 as of 2010. There are 6 streets.

Geography 
Ilyinki is located 17 km northeast of Petushki (the district's administrative centre) by road. Yevdokimtsevo is the nearest rural locality.

References 

Rural localities in Petushinsky District